Solomon Ngobeni (died 14 November 1989) was the last person to be executed by the government of South Africa.

In October 1987, Ngobeni was found guilty and sentenced to death for fatally shooting Mackson Kubayi, a driver of a Peugeot bakkie (a South African term for pickup truck) during a robbery in Nwamitwa, Transvaal. Ngobeni was convicted and hanged at Pretoria Central Prison on 14 November 1989.

In 1990, President F. W. de Klerk declared a moratorium on the execution of capital sentences. In June 1995, in the case of S v Makwanyane, the Constitutional Court of South Africa held that capital punishment was an unconstitutional form of punishment.

See also

Capital punishment in South Africa

External links
Solomon Ngobeni - South Africa, truecrimelibrary.com

1989 deaths
20th-century executions by South Africa
Executed South African people
People convicted of murder by South Africa
People executed for murder
South African people convicted of murder
People executed by South Africa by hanging
Year of birth missing